Giorgi Bagrationi ((born 27 September 2011), is a Georgian prince of the Bagrationi dynasty, which reigned until the early 19th century in Georgia and its successive realms.

Family
Born in Spain, Giorgi is the only child of Prince David Bagration-Mukhrani and Princess Anna Bagration-Gruzinsky, born to their (only) civil marriage in 2010 (their religious marriage had been contracted in February 2009 and was dissolved in August 2009). He potentially unites in his person the claims of the Mukhraneli and Gruzinsky branches of the House of Bagration to the former throne of the Kingdom of Georgia. If no other Bagrationi prince is born in either the Gruzinsky or Mukhraneli branch who is of senior descent in the male line, and he survives those now living, he will become the genealogical heir male of the Bagrationi dynasty as well as the heir general of Georgia's last monarch, King George XII. He is also the direct descendant of Mirian III of Iberia, the first Christian king of Georgia.

Since the divorce of Giorgi's parents, he has been pictured in attendance at several civic and religious events with his father. On 2 April 2016, accompanying Prince David, Giorgi visited and was photographed in Tbilisi with the Catholicos-Patriarch of All Georgia Ilia II, who had christened him.

Succession dispute
Prince Nugzar Bagration-Gruzinsky has, however, yet to officially recognize his grandson as the heir to the Georgian throne or to the Gruzinsky branch.

Nugzar has demanded that David sign a written agreement recognizing Nugzar and the Gruzinsky branch as the sole rightful heirs to the Georgian throne and to the legacy of the Georgian kings.

Christening

Giorgi's christening was held on 3 November 2013 by Patriarch Ilia II, primate of the Georgian Orthodox Church, in Svetitskhoveli Cathedral in Mtskheta. His godfathers are the patriarch himself, his uncles Irakli and Ugo, Levan Vasadze, said to be closely associated with ex-Prime Minister Bidzina Ivanishvili and the President Giorgi Margvelashvili, and Mikheil Akhvlediani, the honorary consul of Spain. Government ministers Irakli Alasania and Nodar Khaduri were also present during the ceremony as well as guests from Russia, Serbia, Spain, Portugal, Italy, United States, Austria and Romania.

Patriarch Ilia II of Georgia stated:

Prince Nugzar Bagration-Gruzinsky after the christening of his grandson said:

Giorgi's godfather Mr Levan Vasadze made a statement after his christening:

Honours
Grand Collar of the Order of the Eagle of Georgia and the Seamless Tunic of Our Lord Jesus Christ (at birth).
Grand Cross of the Order of the Royal Order of the Crown of the Georgia Kingdom (27 September 2013).
Honorary Inspector of the Spanish police.

See also
Georgian monarchs family tree of Bagrationi dynasty

References

2011 births
Nobility from Madrid
Living people
Georgian princes
Royal children
Bagrationi dynasty of the Kingdom of Kartli-Kakheti
House of Mukhrani
Pretenders to the Georgian throne
Eastern Orthodox Christians from Georgia (country)